Badhan District is a district located in the Sanaag region of Somaliland. Its capital is Badhan.

Demographics 
The district is mainly populated by the Warsangeli sub-division of the Harti Darod with a minority of the Abbas Muse sub-division of the Surre Dir.

See also
Administrative divisions of Somaliland
Regions of Somaliland
Districts of Somaliland
Somalia–Somaliland border

References

External links
 Administrative map of Badhan District

Districts of Somaliland